Chartbeat is a technology company that provides data and analytics to global publishers. The company was started in 2009 and is headquartered in New York City, US. The software as a service (SaaS) company integrates code into the websites of publishers, media companies and news organizations to track users in order to monetize audience engagement and loyalty metrics so they can make decisions about the content to publish and promote on their Web sites. In August 2010, the company was spun off from Betaworks as a separate entity. Chartbeat has been both praised and criticized as an alternative to Google Analytics for real-time data.

History
Betaworks launched Chartbeat in April 2009 as a real-time web analytics tool that, it said, publishers could use to react quickly to changes in user behavior. At the time, Google Analytics did not offer real-time data. The launch of Chartbeat was part of a broader strategy by Betaworks to capitalize on the growth of the real-time, stream-based, social web. Betaworks had also invested in Twitter, Tumblr, bit.ly, and TweetDeck. In August 2010, the company was spun off from Betaworks as a separate entity. In July 2011, Chartbeat launched Newsbeat, a version of their service for news sites. In February 2016, founding CEO Tony Haile resigned from the company after seven years as CEO.  Long time COO John Saroff was named as his successor. In October 2017, Chartbeat made updates to its user experience and design, including the rebrand of its flagship product as Chartbeat for Publishing.

References

External links
Twitter profile

Web analytics